Manto Mavrogenous (1796 – July 1848) was a Greek heroine of the Greek War of Independence. A rich woman, she spent all her fortune for the Hellenic cause. Under her encouragement, her European friends contributed money and guns to the revolution.

Early life
Manto Mavrogenous was born in Trieste, then in the Habsburg monarchy, now part of Italy. She was daughter of the merchant and member of the Filiki Eteria, Nikolaos Mavrogenis and his wife, Zacharati Chatzi Bati. One of her ancestors, the great-uncle of her father, Nicholas Mavrogenes, was Dragoman of the Fleet and Prince of Wallachia.

A beautiful woman of aristocratic lineage, she grew up in an educated family, influenced by the Age of Enlightenment. She studied ancient Greek philosophy and history at a college in Trieste, and spoke French, Italian and Turkish fluently.

Greek War of Independence

In 1809, she moved to Paros with her family, where she learned from her father that the Filiki Eteria was preparing what would become known as the Greek Revolution and later, in 1818, after her father's death, she left for Tinos. When the struggle began, she went to Mykonos, the island of her origin, and invited the leaders of Mykonos to join the revolution.

She equipped, manned and "privateered" at her own expense, two ships with which she pursued the pirates who attacked Mykonos and other islands of Cyclades. On 22 October 1822, the Mykonians repulsed the Ottoman Turks, who had debarked on the island, under her leadership. She also equipped 150 men to campaign in the Peloponnese and sent forces and financial support to Samos, when the island was threatened by the Turks. Later, Mavrogenous sent another corps of fifty men to Peloponnese, who took part in the Siege of Tripolitsa and the fall of the town to the Greek rebels. Together, she spent money for the relief of the soldiers and their families, the preparation of a campaign to Northern Greece and the support of several philhellenes.

She later put together a fleet of six ships and an infantry consisting of sixteen companies, with fifty men each, and took part in the battle in Karystos in 1822, and funded a campaign to Chios, but she did not prevent it from the massacre. Another group of fifty men was sent to reinforce Nikitaras in the Battle of Dervenakia. When the Ottoman fleet appeared in Cyclades, she returned to Tinos and sold her jewelry to finance the equipment of 200 men who fought the enemy and cherish two thousand people who had survived from the first siege of Missolonghi. Her men participated in several other battles like those of Pelion, Phthiotis and Livadeia.

Mavrogenous led enlightenment expeditions in Europe and addressed an appeal to the women of Paris, to side up with the Greeks. She moved to Nafplio in 1823, in order to be in the core of the struggle, leaving her family as she was despised even by her mother because of her choices. It is at this time that Mavrogenous met Demetrios Ypsilantis, with whom she was soon engaged. Soon, she became famous around Europe for her beauty and bravery. But in May of the same year, her home was totally burnt and her fortune was stolen, and as a result she went to Tripoli to live with Ypsilanti, while Papaflessas provided her with food. 

Mavrogenous' engagement to Demetrios Ypsilantis was opposed by several powerful politicians who saw the unification of two powerful families, Mavrogenis and Ypsilantis, which held pro-Russian affiliations as a threat. Chief among their opponents in Greece was Ioannis Kolettis who lead the successful charge to break the engagement. After the engagement she returned to Nafplio, where she lived, deeply depressed, in destitution and was not repaid the money she had given for various battles. After Ypsilanti's death and her intense political conflicts with Ioannis Kolettis, she was exiled from Nafplio and returned to Mykonos, where she occupied with the writing of her memoirs.

When the war ended Ioannis Kapodistrias awarded her the rank of the Lieutenant General and granted her a dwelling in Nafplio, where she moved. She owned a treasurable sword, with the inscription "Δίκασον Κύριε τους αδικούντας με, τους πολεμούντας με, βασίλευε των Βασιλευόντων", which is translated to 'Lord, judge those who wrong me, who battle me, rule over the Kings'. That sword is said to come from the times of Constantine the Great and Mavrogenous gave it to Kapodistrias.

Later years
Mavrogenous moved to Paros in 1840, where some of her relatives resided, and lived and died in a house that is still privately owned.  The home is located near the Panagia Ekatontapyliani (the Church of the Virgin Mary) which, tradition says, was founded by Saint Helena, mother of Constantine the Great. Mavrogenous died on Paros in July 1848, alone and impoverished, having spent all her fortune for the War of Independence.

Legacy
The central plaza in the capital town of Mykonos bears her name and contains a larger than life bust of her. The main square in the port town of Paroikia in Paros has also been given her name. Greece has honored this heroine by naming several streets across the country after her. The Greek government has released several commemorative coins in her honor. A film was also made about her life, titled Manto Mavrogenous (1971), in which she was portrayed by Tzeni Karezi.

Mavrogenous was depicted on the reverse of the Greek 2 drachmas coin of 1988–2001.

Relatives
Manto has relatives in the Mavrogenous/Delicari family

References

1796 births
1848 deaths
People from Trieste
Greek people of the Greek War of Independence
Women in the Greek War of Independence
Manto